Cato was launched at Stockton in 1800 and registered in London to Reeve & Green.

History
Cato first appears in Lloyd's Register in 1802 with C. Pearson, master, changing to I. Park, and trade London—Suriname. The Register of Shipping has a little more information; it also reports Catos armament, and shows her trade changing to London—Botany Bay.

Cato, Park, master, arrived in Port Jackson, New South Wales, from England on 9 March 1803, carrying stores.

On 17 August the three ships got caught near a sandbank, 157 miles north and 51 miles east of Sandy Cape. With shrinking leeway, both Cato and Porpoise grounded.

Bridgewater sailed on, despite knowing that the other two vessels had come to grief. The crew and passengers of the wrecked vessels were able to land on a sandbank as both their ships broke up.

On 26 August 1803 with no sign of rescue, Porpoise passenger Matthew Flinders and Captain John Park of Cato took the largest cutter (which they named Hope), and twelve crewmen and headed to Sydney to seek rescue. Through marvelous navigation, Hope made it to Port Jackson by 8 September. Rolla then took the people she had rescued to Canton.

Naming
Cato also gave its name to the nearby Cato Reef, which it discovered.

Citations

References
 
 

Shipwrecks of Queensland
Ships built on the River Tees
Shipwrecks in the Coral Sea
History of New South Wales
Maritime incidents in 1803
1804 in Australia
1788–1850 ships of Australia
Merchant ships of Australia
Full-rigged ships of Australia
Australian Shipwrecks with protected zone
Age of Sail merchant ships
Merchant ships of the United Kingdom